Naiane Rios (born ) is a Brazilian female volleyball player. She competed at the 2015 U23 World Championship. and 2017 FIVB Volleyball World Grand Prix.

Personal life

Rios is openly lesbian.

Clubs
  Oi Macaé (2010–2011)
  E.C. Pinheiros (2011–2014)
  Minas Tênis Clube (2014–2017)
  Hinode Barueri (2017–2018)
  Vôlei Bauru (2018–2020)
  Osasco/Audax (2020-)

Awards

Individuals
 2010 CSV U17 South American Championship – "Best Setter"
 2012 CSV U19 South American Championship – "Best Setter"

References

External links
 FIVB Biography

1994 births
Living people
Brazilian women's volleyball players
Place of birth missing (living people)
Lesbian sportswomen
Setters (volleyball)
Sportspeople from Belém